Route 114 is a  numbered state highway in the U.S. state of Rhode Island. It connects the city of Newport to the city of Woonsocket. Route 114 was a major north–south artery for its entire length until the arrival of the Interstate Highway System. It is still a major commercial corridor on Aquidneck Island and in northern Rhode Island (mainly Central Falls, Cumberland, and Woonsocket).

Route description

Route 114 begins at the Newport city line in the town of Middletown, at an intersection with Route 138 and Broadway. The resultant route 138 continues west into Newport as Admiral Kalbfus Way. Route 114 heads north on West Main Road in Middletown and Portsmouth. In Portsmouth the right lane becomes Route 24 as the left lane curves maintaining Route 114 in Portsmouth, Route 114 turns onto Bristol Ferry Road then crosses Mount Hope Bay into the town of Bristol along the Mount Hope Bridge. In Bristol, it continues north along Ferry Road then shifts to Hope Street. The route then enters the town of Warren, along Main Street through the town center, where it meets and conjoins Route 103. The concurrent route crosses the Palmer and Barrington rivers into the town of Barrington. Routes 114 and 103 continue together along County Road, with Route 114 soon splitting to the north using the Wampanoag Trail. Route 114 eventually reaches the city of East Providence, where the road curves west to meet Route 103 again at Pawtucket Avenue. Along the way, the East Shore Expressway begins at the Wampanoag Trail to connect to I-195. Pawtucket Avenue continues north through downtown East Providence, crossing over I-195, where it is joined by US 1A.

Routes 1A and 114 continue through the northern part of East Providence towards the city of Pawtucket, with US 1A later splitting off to the north as Route 114 heads northwest into the city of Pawtucket. In Pawtucket, Route 114 splits into a one-way couplet with the northbound direction using Prospect Street and the southbound direction using School Street. After running through several Pawtucket city streets, including an interchange with I-95, Route 114 crosses the Blackstone River and continues north along Broad Street into the city of Central Falls. After crossing the Blackstone River into the town of Cumberland, Route 114 shifts one block east to High Street as it heads towards the village of Valley Falls. The road continues north as Diamond Hill Road towards the rural areas of Cumberland, intersecting I-295 along the way. At the intersection with Route 121, Route 114 turns west along Pine Swamp Road towards the city of Woonsocket. In Woonsocket, Route 114 continues west as Diamond Hill Road, Privilege Street, and Winter Street, ending at Route 122.

History

Two sections of modern Route 114 were previously laid out as turnpikes in the early 19th century. In 1805, a charter was granted to the Rhode Island Turnpike corporation, which constructed a road from Portsmouth center to the Bristol Ferry at the north end of Aquidneck Island. The road is now Bristol Ferry Road (Route 114) and Turnpike Avenue. In 1813, the road from northern Pawtucket to the village of Valley Falls in Cumberland was also laid out as a turnpike, known as the Valley Falls Turnpike. The old road is what is now Broad Street in Pawtucket, Central Falls, and Cumberland.

Route 114 was an original Rhode Island route designated in 1923, running from Newport to Grants Mills in Cumberland. Until the 1960s, Route 114 ended at the intersection of Pine Swamp Road and Diamond Hill Road in Cumberland. Present-day Route 114 from that point west to Route 122 in Woonsocket, Rhode Island was given the Route 142 and later the Route 11 designation. When Route 11 became Route 121 in the 1960s, Route 121's terminus was cut back to the same intersection where Route 114 originally ended, and the route west to Woonsocket became Route 114.

In 2000, part of Route 114 northbound south of downtown Pawtucket was re-routed. The old alignment left Prospect Street at Pond Street, went east along Pond Street to Summit Street, north on Summit Street (this turn onto Summit is still signed as of July 2005) and re-joined Route 114 southbound at the corner of Summit Street and Division Street.

Major intersections

East Shore Expressway
The East Shore Expressway is a  spur of Route 114 in East Providence. It provides quick access between Route 114 south and I-195 west. The expressway, as it exists today, was completed on December 15, 1959, after two years of construction. Originally, the expressway was to have extended further south towards the Mount Hope Bridge over Mount Hope Bay, but those plans were cancelled sometime after 1959.

Exit list

See also

Notes

References

External links

 Steve Anderson's BostonRoads.com: Mount Hope Bridge (RI 114)
 Steve Anderson's BostonRoads.com: East Shore Expressway (RI 114, unbuilt)
2019 Highway Map, Rhode Island

114
Transportation in Providence County, Rhode Island
Transportation in Bristol County, Rhode Island
Transportation in Newport County, Rhode Island
Cumberland, Rhode Island
Woonsocket, Rhode Island
Newport, Rhode Island
East Providence, Rhode Island
Barrington, Rhode Island
Portsmouth, Rhode Island
Central Falls, Rhode Island
Middletown, Rhode Island
Warren, Rhode Island
Bristol, Rhode Island
Pawtucket, Rhode Island